The bony-headed toad (Ingerophrynus galeatus) is a species of toad in the family Bufonidae.
It is found in Cambodia, Laos, and Vietnam. Earlier it has been also reported from Hainan Island (China), but these have now been named as a new species, Ingerophrynus ledongensis.
Its natural habitats are subtropical or tropical moist lowland forests, subtropical or tropical moist montane forests, and rivers.
It is threatened by habitat loss.

References

Ingerophrynus
Amphibians of Cambodia
Amphibians of Laos
Amphibians of Vietnam
Amphibians described in 1864
Taxa named by Albert Günther
Taxonomy articles created by Polbot